Statistics of Football Clubs Association Championship in the 1926–27 season.

Athens Football Clubs Association

Qualification round

Final round

Both matches took place at Leoforos Alexandras Stadium, on 5 and 27 June 1927, respectively:

|+Championship play-offs

|}

Panathinaikos won the Athenian championship.

Piraeus Football Clubs Association

|+Championship play-off

|}

|+Replay

|}

Olympiacos won the Piraeus' championship.

*Initially, the match was scheduled to take place on 12 June 1927 at Panathinaikos' stadium, but due to the fact that Panathinaikos wanted the postponed match with AEK Athens for the  Athenian championship final, the match between Olympiacos and Ethnikos was held at Panellinios' stadium. After an episodic game, Olympiakos prevailed 4–2. However, due to the fact that the fight after the episodes was delayed to end, the Piraeus' association set for a rematch initially on 10 July and then its next decision was to postpone it to September. Finally the match was decided to take place on 17 July 1927 at Panathinaikos' stadium, where Olympiakos won by 1–0.

Macedonia Football Clubs Association

References

External links
Rsssf 1926–27 championship

 

Panhellenic Championship seasons
Greece
1926–27 in Greek football